This is a recap of the 1966 season for the Professional Bowlers Association (PBA) Tour.  It was the tour's eighth season, and consisted of 29 events. Wayne Zahn won three titles, including the Firestone Tournament of Champions and the seventh PBA National Championship, making him an easy choice for the Sporting News PBA Player of the Year award.

Tournament schedule

External links
1966 Season Schedule

Professional Bowlers Association seasons
1966 in bowling